Helen O'Connell (May 23, 1920 – September 9, 1993) was an American singer, actress, and hostess, described as "the quintessential big band singer of the 1940s".

Early life
Born in Lima, Ohio, O'Connell grew up in Toledo, Ohio. By the time she was 15, she and her older sister, Alice, were singing duets in clubs and hotels and on radio stations in Toledo.

Career
O'Connell launched her career as a big-band singer with Larry Funk and his Band of a Thousand Melodies. She was singing with Funk's band in Greenwich Village when Jimmy Dorsey's manager discovered her.

O'Connell joined the Dorsey band in 1939 and achieved her best selling records in the early 1940s with "Green Eyes", "Amapola," "Tangerine" and "Yours". In each of these Latin-influenced numbers, Bob Eberly crooned the song which Helen then reprised in an up-tempo arrangement. O'Connell was selected by Down Beat readers as best female singer in 1940 and 1941 and won the 1940 Metronome magazine poll for best female vocalist. In a 1993 obituary article, the Associated Press described O'Connell as "the darling of GIs during World War II".

O'Connell retired from show business upon her first marriage in 1943. When her marriage ended in 1951, she resumed her career, achieving some chart success and making regular appearances on television. In 1953, O'Connell and Bob Eberly headlined TV's Top Tunes, a summer replacement program for Perry Como's CBS television show. The program also featured Ray Anthony and his orchestra. In March 1955 O'Connell visited Australia as a support act on the landmark tour headlined by singer Johnnie Ray, which set a new box office record for Australia that stood until the 1964 visit by The Beatles (and during which local media also reported that O'Connell was romantically linked with Ray). O'Connell also was the featured singer on The Russ Morgan Show on CBS TV in 1956. In 1957, she had her own 15-minute program, The Helen O'Connell Show, twice a week on NBC.

Helen was one of the first "girls" on NBC's The Today Show, commenting at the time, "I wasn't hired as a singer, I was hired as a talker, a pleasant switch." She had that role from 1956 to 1958.

In 1961, Helen co-hosted the Desilu-NBC program, Here's Hollywood, conducting interviews with celebrities, often in their own homes. O'Connell co-hosted the Miss USA and Miss Universe pageants with Bob Barker from 1972 to 1980 and was nominated for an Emmy award in 1976 for her coverage of the Miss Universe pageant. O'Connell sang duets with Bing Crosby, Johnny Mercer, and Dean Martin. She also sang the National Anthem for Super Bowl XV in 1981. O'Connell's 1942 recording of Brazil with the Jimmy Dorsey Orchestra was a 2009 addition to the Grammy Hall of Fame.

In 1992, Helen was featured along with The Andrews Sisters and Kay Starr in the KCET special, "Those Fabulous 40s". Her final performance was at the Valley Forge Music Festival in Valley Forge, Pennsylvania on August 14, 1993.

Personal life and death 
O'Connell was married to wealthy playboy Clifford Smith, Jr., from 1941 to 1951 and novelist Tom T. Chamales from 1957 to 1960 and had four daughters. Her last marriage was in 1991, to arranger-conductor-composer Frank De Vol. It ended with her death on September 9, 1993, in San Diego, California, following a battle with cancer. Her funeral was held at St. Paul's Catholic Church in Westwood, California, where she was a member.

References

External links
 

1920 births
1993 deaths
20th-century American actresses
20th-century American singers
20th-century American women singers
American people of Irish descent
American Roman Catholics
Beauty pageant hosts
Big band singers
Burials at Holy Cross Cemetery, Culver City
Capitol Records artists
Deaths from cancer in California
Deaths from hepatitis
Deaths from liver cancer
Infectious disease deaths in California
Kapp Records artists
People from Lima, Ohio
RCA Victor artists
Singers from Ohio
Traditional pop music singers